Raimo Olavi Piirainen (born 22 December 1952 in Kajaani) is a Finnish politician currently serving in the Parliament of Finland for the Social Democratic Party of Finland at the Oulu constituency. He first entered parliament in 2009 to replace Liisa Jaakonsaari, who had been elected as a Member of European Parliament. He lost his seat at the 2015 Finnish parliamentary election, and was re-elected to his Oulu parliamentary seat in 2019.

References

1952 births
Living people
People from Kajaani
Social Democratic Party of Finland politicians
Members of the Parliament of Finland (2007–11)
Members of the Parliament of Finland (2011–15)
Members of the Parliament of Finland (2019–23)